The 2014 OFC Futsal Championship, also known as the OFC Futsal Championship Invitational 2014, was the tenth edition of the main international futsal tournament of the Oceanian region, organized by the Oceania Football Confederation (OFC). It took place from 12 to 16 August 2014, and was hosted by Païta, New Caledonia.

Five teams took part in the tournament, including Malaysia (appearing as guest nation).

Squads

Each team submitted a squad of 12 players, including two goalkeepers. The squads were announced on 5 August 2014.

Group stage

Group

References

External links
Futsal Invitational Schedule & Results, oceaniafootball.com

2014
2014 in futsal
Futsal Championship
2014 in New Caledonian sport
2014
Futsal in New Caledonia